Taft Hotel  may refer to:

 Taft Hotel (New Haven)
 The Michelangelo, formerly the Hotel Taft